Maramatana Rural LLG is a local-level government (LLG) of Milne Bay Province, Papua New Guinea.

Wards
01. Lavora
02. Topura
03. Iapoa No. 1
04. Wamawamana
05. Taupota
06. Garuahi
07. Awaiama
08. Keia
09. Iapoa No. 2
10. Porotana
11. Huhuna
12. Guga
13. Wagohuhu
14. Biwa
15. Ibulai
16. Ronana
17. East Cape
18. Iabam/Pahilele
19. Nuakata

References

Local-level governments of Milne Bay Province